Daniele Rosania (born 22 March 1991) is an Italian footballer who currently plays for S.S.D. Audace Cerignola.

Biography

Youth career
Born in Terracina, the Province of Latina, Lazio, Rosania started his career at Macir Cisterna. He then left for Lupa Frascati, 20 km away from Rome. He was selected to Lazio region Allievi representative team in 2007. Rosania later joined Latina. In January 2009 Rosania left for Serie B club Ascoli Calcio 1898, where he spent  seasons in the reserve league from 2009 to 2011.

Ascoli–Chievo swap
In June 2010, few days before the closure of 2009–10 financial year, Rosania left for Serie A club Chievo, in exchange with Filippo Tanaglia. Both clubs purchased half of the registration rights which "valued" €500,000. The deals made both clubs had notional selling profit.

Rosania returned to Ascoli Piceno immediately on 2 July 2010. He made 16 league appearances in the reserve league that season.

Ascoli return
In June 2011 both Rosania and Tanaglia returned to their mother clubs for €500,000. Rosania signed a 4-year contract, but became a financial burden of the club. 

Rosania was awarded a temporary first team number of no.91 shirt in August 2011.

Lanciano (loan)
On 31 August 2011 Rosania left for Lanciano along with Capece and Margarita, On the same day Tamási also left the club in temporary deal, made none of the expensive new signing actually played for Ascoli in 2011–12 season. Rosania won promotion to Serie B for Lanciano in 2012. The temporary deal of Rosania was renewed in 2012–13 season.

Third Spell with Ascoli
Rosania returned to Ascoli on 1 July 2013, which the club had to play in the third division after relegation. Rosania made his Ascoli debut during the first half of the season.

Catanzaro (loan)
On 24 January 2014 he was signed by Catanzaro.

Pordenone
On 20 August 2014 he was signed by Pordenone in a 2-year contract. He was released after the club relegated to Serie D. However, Pordenone and the future club of Rosania, Paganese, they were re-admitted to 2015–16 Lega Pro to replace the vacancies.

Paganese
On 3 September 2015 Rosania was signed by Paganese.

Notes

References

External links
 Football.it Profile 
 
 

Italian footballers
Latina Calcio 1932 players
Ascoli Calcio 1898 F.C. players
S.S. Virtus Lanciano 1924 players
U.S. Catanzaro 1929 players
Pordenone Calcio players
Paganese Calcio 1926 players
Lupa Roma F.C. players
S.S. Juve Stabia players
F.C. Grosseto S.S.D. players
Taranto F.C. 1927 players
S.S.D. Audace Cerignola players
Serie B players
Serie C players
Serie D players
Association football defenders
People from Terracina
1991 births
Living people
Footballers from Lazio
Sportspeople from the Province of Latina